The Jack Hills mine is a haematite iron ore mine located  northeast of Geraldton and  northwest of Cue in the Mid West region of Western Australia. Murchison Metals began mining operations at Jack Hills on 21 September 2006, with a projected mine life of five years. The first shipment of ore was made in February 2007. Ore was trucked by road to the port of Geraldton for export. Mining was suspended in November 2012 and the project was placed on care and maintenance in June 2013. 

The Jack Hills mine was initially owned and operated by Murchison Metals. Mitsubishi Corporation paid Murchison Metals A$150 million for an initial 50% stake in the mine in 2007 and a further A$325 million for the remainder in 2012. In 2019 the inactive project was sold to Sinosteel Ocean Capital.

References

External links
 MINEDEX website: Jack Hills Database of the Department of Mines, Industry Regulation and Safety

Iron ore mines in Western Australia
Shire of Murchison
Surface mines in Australia